Goatsbeard or Goat's beard is a common name for several plants and may refer to:

 Aruncus, in the family Rosaceae
 Tragopogon, in the family Asteraceae
 Astilbe, some species of which are known as "False Goat's Beard"